The Bob Kerrey Pedestrian Bridge is a  footbridge across the Missouri River between Council Bluffs, Iowa, and Omaha, Nebraska. It opened on September 28, 2008.

Interest in a landmark bridge across the Missouri River arose after Omaha and Council Bluffs began replacing their older crossings with girder bridges which do not have towers (most notably the Ak-Sar-Ben Bridge). The bridge is named after former Nebraska Senator Bob Kerrey, who secured $18 million of federal funding for the bridge in 2000.

The bridge was redesigned in 2004 after the lowest bid for the project was $44 million. In May 2006, a final cable-stayed bridge design by Kansas City engineering and architectural firm HNTB was selected for the bridge. Groundbreaking for construction of the bridge occurred on October 26, 2006.

The bridge is north of the Interstate 480 (I-480) girder bridge and connects the Port of Omaha's Miller Landing to One Renaissance Center in the former Dodge Park Playland in Council Bluffs.

The lights on the bridge were donated by Gallup, which has their corporate headquarters and Gallup University located on the Missouri River adjacent the Omaha landing of the bridge. The bridge lights include programmable controls that can display multiple colors in the large lights at the top of the towers and alter brightness and timing of the lights that run the entire length of the bridge. The lights were officially unveiled in a ceremony on September 13, 2008. The bridge lights were turned on while the Phil Collins song "In The Air Tonight"  was played over a PA system. The event was accompanied by fireworks.

Due to safety concerns prompted by the 2011 Missouri River floods, the entrance on the Iowa side was closed on July 2 of that year. It reopened September 3, 2011.

In 2015, the bridge joined Twitter as @BobTBridge, an effort by the Omaha Convention & Visitors Bureau.

See also

Trails in Omaha
List of crossings of the Missouri River
Parks in Omaha

References

External links

Video walking tour of bridge

Bridges in Omaha, Nebraska
Pedestrian bridges in Iowa
Buildings and structures in Council Bluffs, Iowa
Cyclist bridges in the United States
Tourist attractions in Omaha, Nebraska
Bridges over the Missouri River
Bridges completed in 2008
Cable-stayed bridges in the United States
Bridges in Pottawattamie County, Iowa
Pedestrian bridges in Nebraska
Girder bridges in the United States
2008 establishments in Iowa
2008 establishments in Nebraska